Bryan Adrés Ormeño Cid (born 11 May 1993), is a Chilean footballer  who plays as defender for Universidad Católica in the Primera División de Chile.

Club career
Bryan debuts at UC in the national tournament play from the first minute to Cobresal.

External links
UC profile

1993 births
Living people
Chilean footballers
Club Deportivo Universidad Católica footballers
Deportes Valdivia footballers
Footballers from Santiago
Association football fullbacks